Piergiorgio Cortelazzo (Este, 20 February 1969) is an Italian politician from Veneto.

He was first elected to the Regional Council of Veneto in 2000 for National Alliance and was then re-elected in 2005 and 2010. Between 2005 and 2010 he was floor leader of National Alliance in the Council, while from 2010 to 2015 he was deputy floor leader of the group of The People of Freedom.

References

1969 births
Living people
National Alliance (Italy) politicians
The People of Freedom politicians
21st-century Italian politicians
People from the Province of Padua
Members of the Regional Council of Veneto